District 10 may refer to:

Places
District 10 (Ho Chi Minh city), Vietnam
District 10 (Zürich), in Switzerland
 District 10, an electoral district of Malta
 District 10, a police district of Malta
District 10 School, a historic school in Margaretville, New York, USA
District 10 Schoolhouse, a historic school in Hartland, New York, USA

Art, entertainment, and media
District 10 (Hunger Games), fictional district in the Hunger Games books and films
District 10, the possible sequel to the film District 9, as referred to by Neill Blomkamp

See also
10th arrondissement (disambiguation)
District 9 (disambiguation)
District 11 (disambiguation)